Ryszard Błażyca (1 April 1896 – 28 September 1981) was a Polish wrestler. He competed in the men's Greco-Roman lightweight at the 1928 Summer Olympics.

References

1896 births
1981 deaths
Polish male sport wrestlers
Olympic wrestlers of Poland
Wrestlers at the 1928 Summer Olympics
Sportspeople from Ruda Śląska
20th-century Polish people